Andriy Oleksandrovych Haydash (born 16 January 1989) is a Ukrainian footballer who plays for TSK Simferopol. He is son of Oleksandr Haydash, former football player. He also holds Russian citizenship as Andrei Aleksandrovich Gaydash.

He made his Russian National Football League debut for FC SKA-Energiya Khabarovsk on 6 July 2014 in a game against FC Luch-Energiya Vladivostok.

References

External links
 Career summary by sportbox.ru
 
 
 

1989 births
Sportspeople from Simferopol
Living people
Ukrainian footballers
Association football forwards
Ukrainian expatriate footballers
Expatriate footballers in Russia
MFC Mykolaiv players
FC Metalurh Zaporizhzhia players
FC Tytan Armyansk players
FC SKA-Khabarovsk players
FC Krymteplytsia Molodizhne players
FC Mariupol players
FC Khimik Krasnoperekopsk players
FC Metalist Kharkiv players
FC TSK Simferopol players
Crimean Premier League players